Li Dazhang ( December 1900 – May 3, 1976) was a People's Republic of China politician. He was born in Hejiang County, Luzhou, Sichuan Province. In 1920 Li went to France on the same work-study leave scheme attended by numerous high level Communist leaders. Subsequently, from 1924 to 1927 he studied at the Communist University of the Toilers of the East in Moscow, Soviet Union. From 1955 to 1965 Li was governor of his home province and then briefly Communist Party of China Committee First Secretary of neighbouring Guizhou Province.

Li's career was not significantly damaged by the ravages of the Cultural Revolution and in April 1969 he was elected to the 9th Central Committee of the CPC and re-elected to the 10th in August 1973. During this time he maintained leadership roles in Sichuan although not at the highest levels. His big break occurred in November 1975 when he was moved to Beijing to head up the powerful United Front Work Department of the CPC. This all proved short-lived as he died only six months later.
He died in Beijing.

1900 births
1976 deaths
People's Republic of China politicians from Sichuan
Chinese Communist Party politicians from Sichuan
Governors of Sichuan
Political office-holders in Guizhou
Communist University of the Toilers of the East alumni
Politicians from Luzhou